Witold Bańka (born 3 October 1984) is a Polish former 400 metres sprinter turned politician. Since November 2015, he has been the Minister of Sport and Tourism in the cabinet of Beata Szydło and cabinet of Mateusz Morawiecki. In May 2019, he was elected President of the World Anti-Doping Agency (WADA).

Athletic career
Bańka's biggest achievement as an athlete was the bronze medal in the 4 × 400 metres relay at the 2007 World Championships although he only competed in the heats. He also won several relay medals at lower level competitions. He retired from professional sport in 2012 having failed to qualify for the 2012 Summer Olympics.

Personal bests
Outdoor
200 metres – 21.83 (+1.5 m/s, Bielsko-Biała 2006)
400 metres – 46.11 (Osaka 2007)
Indoor
400 metres – 48.87 (Spała 2009)

Competition record

1He was not selected for the final where the Polish team finished third but also received a bronze medal.

Political career
In 2018 he became a candidate for the chair of the World Anti-Doping Agency. Poland’s sport minister Witold Banka has been chosen as Europe’s candidate to become the next head of the World Anti-Doping Agency. In May 2019 Bańka was elected as WADA's fourth president, commencing his four-year term on 1 January 2020. WADA Foundation Board re-elects President Witold Bańka to 2025 year.

See also
Sport in Poland
Politics of Poland
List of Poles

References

External links
 Government composition
 All-Athletics profile

1984 births
Living people
Polish male sprinters
People from Tychy
Sportspeople from Silesian Voivodeship
Polish sportsperson-politicians
Government ministers of Poland
Law and Justice politicians
World Anti-Doping Agency members
Universiade gold medalists in athletics (track and field)
Universiade gold medalists for Poland
Universiade silver medalists for Poland
Medalists at the 2007 Summer Universiade
Medalists at the 2009 Summer Universiade
Universiade silver medalists in athletics (track and field)